Saint Paul University is a bilingual Catholic Pontifical university federated with the University of Ottawa since 1965. It is located on Main Street in Canada's capital city, Ottawa, Ontario. Fully bilingual, it offers instruction in both of the country's official languages: French and English. The university has been entrusted for over a century and a half to the Congregation of the Missionary Oblates of Mary Immaculate. In August 1866, the university was endowed a civil charter that was passed by the government which was then called the Province of Canada. It later received a pontifical declaration promulgated by Pope Leo XIII on 5 February 1889.

History
In 1848, Joseph-Bruno Guigues, the first bishop of the Roman Catholic Archdiocese of Ottawa, established the College of Bytown.  In 1856, the college was officially entrusted to the Missionary Oblates of Mary Immaculate, and, in 1866, it was renamed the College of Ottawa.  The institution would later rewrite its pontifical charter in keeping with the Apostolic Constitution of Pope Pius XI, and also rewrote its civil charter around the same time.  Its rewritten civil charter was approved by the Government of Ontario in 1933, when it was officially renamed the University of Ottawa, and its revised pontifical charter was approved by the Holy See in 1934.  On July 1, 1965, by an act of the Ontario Legislature, the institution previously known as the University of Ottawa was renamed Saint Paul University, which retained its civil and pontifical charters, while a new corporate body, to be known as the University of Ottawa, was created to inherit the majority of the university's holdings.

Faculties 
 Canon Law
 Human Sciences
 Philosophy
 Theology

Undergraduate programs
 Social Communications
 Human Relations and Spirituality
 Public Ethics and Philosophy
 Conflict Studies
 Social Innovation
 Theology

Graduate programs 
 Counselling, Psychotherapy and Spirituality
 Canon Law 
 Conflict Studies
 Public Ethics and Philosophy
 Transformative Leadership and Spirituality
 Theology

Research centers and institutes 
 Research Centre for Vatican II and 21st Century Catholicism
 Centre for Religious Education and Catechesis
 Research Centre in Public Ethics and Governance
 Centre for Research on Conflict 
 Sophia Research Centre 
 Lonergan Centre

Research chairs 
 Research Chair for Religious History of Canada
 Chair in Christian Family Studies 
 Mercy and Presentation Sisters Chair

Services 
 Jean-Léon Allie Library and Archives
 Office of Research and Ethics
 Office of Admission, Registrar and Student Services 
 Alumni and Development Office 
 Internship Office 
 Counselling and Psychotherapy Centre
 Centre for Canonical Services (CCS)
 Multiservices Centre
 Computer and Distance Education Services 
 Pastoral Services 
 Recruitment and Communications Services 
 Financial Services 
 Facilities Services 
 Human Resources Services 
 Food and Conference Services

Jean-Léon Allie Library and Archives 
The collection contains over 500,000 volumes, 1,000 current periodicals and some 100,000 microforms.

History

The library began on April 27, 1937, as the library of the University of Ottawa's seminary. The late Father Jean-Léon Allie, O.M.I., was its founder and first Chief Librarian. After occupying that post for more than 40 years, Father Allie continued to devote all his energies to the Library, as Acquisitions Librarian, then as University Librarian Emeritus, until his death on November 26, 1996.

Starting with only four books, the library began immediately to grow through generous donations from other religious institutions, as well as through the founder's judicious purchases, to become the largest of its kind in Canada. The excellent quality of the library has long been recognized by scholars in philosophy, medieval studies and theology. As early as 1963, in a survey conducted for the National Conference of Canadian Universities and Colleges, Edwin E. Williams of Harvard University stated: "Ottawa (i.e. Saint Paul University) has nationally outstanding collections for philosophy and religious history, with advanced research holdings for work in ... medieval studies."

The organization of the collection follows that of the Library of Congress mixed the Lynn-Peterson Classification System.

Partnership
The university is a member of the Association of Colleges and Universities of the Canadian Francophonie, a network of academic institutions of the Canadian Francophonie.

It was announced from autumn 2017, that St. Paul's, will begin offering, a joint distance learning, Licentiate in Canon Law (JCL) and joint civil masters in canon law with St. Patrick's College, Maynooth, Ireland.

Alumni
Cardinal Francis Eugene George, OMI
Sister Helen Prejean M.A. (1973)

See also

 List of colleges and universities named after people

References

Bibliography

External links

Association of Universities and Colleges of Canada profile

 
1848 establishments in Ontario
Educational institutions established in 1848
Educational institutions established in 1965
French-language universities and colleges in Ontario
Universities in Ontario
Pontifical universities
Catholic Church in Ontario
Catholic universities and colleges in Canada
University of Ottawa
1965 establishments in Ontario